Li Weiwei may refer to:

Li Weiwei (politician) (born 1958), Chinese politician from Hunan
Li Weiwei (handballer) (born 1982), Chinese handball player
Li Weiwei (volleyball) (born 1994), Chinese volleyball player